This is a list of cemeteries in Japan.

 Aoyama Cemetery, Tokyo
 Hattori Reien
 Kobe Municipal Foreign Cemetery
 Okunoin Cemetery (Mount Kōya)
 Sakamoto International Cemetery
 Tama Reien
 Yanaka Cemetery
 Yokohama Foreign General Cemetery
 Zōshigaya Cemetery

See also
 Foreign cemeteries in Japan

References

Japan

Lists of buildings and structures in Japan